The British television mystery music game show I Can See Your Voice premiered the second series on BBC One on 15 October 2022, following a holiday special that aired on 24 December 2021.

Gameplay

Format
Under the original format, the contestants can eliminate one or two mystery singers after each round. The game concludes with the last mystery singer standing which depends on the outcome of a duet performance with a guest artist.

Rewards
If the singer is good, the contestants win ; if the singer is bad, the same amount is given to the bad singer instead.

Rounds
Each episode presents the guest artist and contestants with six people whose identities and singing voices are kept concealed until they are eliminated to perform on the "stage of truth" or remain in the end to perform the final duet.

Episodes

Guest artists

Reception

Television ratings

Source: BARB

Notes

References

I Can See Your Voice (British game show)
2021 British television seasons
2022 British television seasons